The Centre for Human Ecology is an independent academic institute based in Glasgow, Scotland. It was founded in 1972 by Conrad Hal Waddington at the University of Edinburgh.

References

External links
Centre for Human Ecology

Human ecology
Education in Scotland
1972 establishments in Scotland
University of Edinburgh
Research institutes in Scotland